Zoya Konstantinovna Vargina (18 January 1918 - 24 May 2009) was a Soviet-Moldovan Politician (Communist).
In 1961-1966 she was the head of the Main Directorate of Forestry and Nature Protection under the Council of Ministers of the Moldavian SSR.

Biography 
She was born on January 18, 1918, in the village of Polovinno-Ovrazhskoye (now in the Yaransky district of the Kirov region).

In 1942 she graduated from the Volga Forestry Institute with a degree in forestry engineering and was appointed to the position of forester of the Orsha Forestry of the Mari ASSR. The forestry carried out orders for the front: they made blanks for skis, stocks for rifles.

After the war she moved to Moldova. She worked in the apparatus of the Council of Ministers of the Moldavian SSR as a senior assistant. In 1961 - Head of the Main Directorate of Forestry and Nature Protection under the Council of Ministers of the Moldavian SSR. In 1966-1975 - Chairman of the State Forestry Committee of the Council of Ministers of the Moldavian SSR.

She died on May 24, 2009, in the city of Chisinau, Republic of Moldova.

References

1918 births
20th-century Moldovan politicians
Soviet women in politics
Communist Party of Moldavia politicians
Women government ministers of Moldova
2009 deaths
20th-century Moldovan women politicians